is the 3rd single by Misaki Iwasa. It was released on January 8, 2014. It debuted in number one on the weekly Oricon Singles Chart.  It has sold a total of 20,139 copies, as of July 28, 2014 (chart date).

References 

2014 singles
2014 songs
Japanese-language songs
Misaki Iwasa songs
Oricon Weekly number-one singles
Song articles with missing songwriters